Blumenschein is a surname. Notable persons with that surname include:
 Ernest L. Blumenschein (1874–1960), American artist
 Ernest L. Blumenschein House, museum and art gallery in New Mexico
 Tabea Blumenschein (born 1952), German actress
 Yde Schloenbach Blumenschein (1882–1963), Brazilian poet and chronicler